David Ospina Ramírez (born 31 August 1988) is a Colombian professional footballer who plays as a goalkeeper for Saudi Professional League club Al Nassr and captains the Colombia national team.

Ospina began his career at Atlético Nacional, making his debut with the club in 2005. After achieving two domestic titles with Los Verdolagas, Ospina joined French side Nice. In 2014, he joined Arsenal on a four-year deal. During his time in London, Ospina won three trophies with the club: the FA Cup in 2015 and 2017, as well as the 2017 FA Community Shield. In 2018, Ospina was loaned out to Serie A club Napoli. The following year, Napoli permanently signed Ospina. In 2020, Ospina played a pivotal role in Napoli's conquering of the Coppa Italia. Following unsuccessful negotiations to renew his contract with Napoli, Ospina signed for SPL side Al-Nassr in 2022.

Ospina has represented his country at a full international level since 2007. At youth level, Ospina represented Colombia at the 2005 FIFA World Youth Championship. Notably, he was part of the Colombia squads that won gold at the 2005 Bolivarian Games and the 2006 Central American and Caribbean Games. Upon his senior debut against Uruguay, he became the youngest goalkeeper to make an appearance for Colombia. He has since earned 127 caps for his nation, making him his nation's most capped player of all time, appearing at four Copa Américas and two World Cups.

Club career

Atlético Nacional
Ospina began his professional career in Categoría Primera A club Atlético Nacional in 2005. Ospina played a total of 97 matches with the team, even being called to the national team. With the club, Ospina achieved three league titles. In mid-2008, Ospina was transferred to French club Nice.

OGC Nice

After three seasons at Atlético Nacional, at the age of 19, he was transferred to Nice in France for an undisclosed fee, believed to be about €2 million. Ospina was reportedly signed to become the long-term replacement of Hugo Lloris, who had transferred to Lyon for €8.5 million. However, Ospina served as a substitute to Lionel Letizi for the first few months of his career, before breaking into the first team. 

Frédéric Antonetti, the manager of Nice who brought Ospina to the club, said, "He has everything you need to be a top goalkeeper. He's good in the air and he's good on the ground. He has that little extra something to be a champion. Hugo Lloris was an international-standard goalkeeper; so is David."

Four years into his career at Nice, Ospina publicly voiced his desire to leave the club. Nice coach Claude Puel signed promising young French goalkeeper Joris Delle, and announced Delle would be promoted into the first team, sharing the position with Ospina. In the summer of 2012, Turkish club Besiktas attempted to sign Ospina, however the move fell through.

After Ospina's performances at the 2014 World Cup and his rejection of a contract extension, he was linked to many European sides. Despite being heavily linked to Atlético Madrid, Puel announced that Ospina would depart the club to join English side Arsenal.

Arsenal

2014–15 season
On 27 July 2014, Arsenal had confirmed that Ospina had signed for the club on for an undisclosed fee, believed to be £3 million, on a four-year deal. Through the club's official Instagram account, Arsenal revealed that Ospina would wear the number 13 shirt for the club, last worn by loanee Emiliano Viviano. On 23 September 2014, Ospina made his debut for Arsenal in the League Cup match against Southampton, a 2–1 home defeat. He made his second Arsenal appearance on 1 October in their UEFA Champions League group stage match at home to Galatasaray, replacing Alexis Sánchez after starting goalkeeper Wojciech Szczęsny had been sent off for a professional foul on Burak Yılmaz. Ospina conceded the penalty, taken by its earner, but Arsenal won 4–1, making several vital saves in the process. In October, Ospina suffered a thigh injury that would keep him out effectively for the rest of the 2014 calendar year. Ospina resumed his cup duties in a 2–0 win against Hull City, but maintained his place for his full Premier League debut a week later, keeping a clean sheet in a 3–0 win against Stoke City. With first-choice goalkeeper Szczęsny punished for smoking in the dressing room after a game against Southampton, Ospina was made first choice in the league and went on to claim successive clean sheets against Manchester City and Aston Villa. He played every remaining league game until the end of the season, with the exception of FA Cup ties against Brighton & Hove Albion, Middlesbrough, Manchester United and Reading. Moreover, he was also an unused substitute in Arsenal's 4–0 win in the 2015 FA Cup Final against Aston Villa. However, Ospina's performances earned him a place on the FIFA Ballon d'Or longlist for the 2015 campaign.

2015–16 season

During the summer transfer window period, Ospina was linked to Beşiktaş and Everton after Arsenal had signed Chelsea goalkeeper Petr Čech, which effectively demoted Ospina to second-choice keeper. However, no deal materialised, as second-choice Wojciech Szczęsny was loaned to Roma for the season. Ospina made his first appearance of the season in a 2–1 away defeat against Dinamo Zagreb in the 2015–16 Champions League, and as the team's "cup goalkeeper", he made his first domestic appearance in a 2–1 League Cup win over London rivals Tottenham Hotspur. Ospina made another Champions League appearance, against Olympiacos, where his poor performances proved costly in a 3–2 home defeat, with the keeper conceding an own goal by dropping a corner from Kostas Fortounis into his own net'. Ospina would later be dropped from Champions League duties in place of Čech. Ospina suffered a shoulder injury during October's international break that saw him ruled out until November. He was then in contention to face Sunderland in the FA Cup in January, but a training injury saw Čech take his place.

2016–17 season
Ospina made his first start for Arsenal of the 2016–17 season in the club's opening game in the UEFA Champions League Group-stage against French champions Paris Saint Germain, producing a man-of-the-match performance as Arsenal drew 1–1; Ospina himself drew praise for many saves made during the game, mainly against striker Edinson Cavani. Ospina started in the FA cup final where he conceded 1 goal as Arsenal won 2–1.

2017–18 season
Ospina made his first appearance of the season in a 1–0 win over Doncaster Rovers in the Carabao Cup. He made his second start in a 3–1 UEFA Europa League win against FC Cologne, committing an error that led to the team going 1–0 down early on. After Arsenal suffered four straight defeats Ospina kept a clean sheet as the Gunners beat A.C. Milan 2–0 at the San Siro Stadium in the Europa League round of 16 on 8 March.

Napoli
Following the arrival of Bernd Leno, Ospina requested go on loan in order to gain more playing time. On 15 August, Serie A team Napoli agreed to a one-year loan deal with an option to buy following new signing Alex Meret's injury. On 17 March 2019, he suffered a serious head injury during a match against Udinese and later collapsed mid-game.

On 4 July 2019, Napoli permanently signed Ospina from Arsenal. He was initially used in a rotational role with Alex Meret, although he became the team's first choice goalkeeper under the club's manager Gennaro Gattuso, due to his superior ability with the ball at his feet. In the second leg of the Coppa Italia semi-finals against Inter Milan, Ospina committed an error on the opening goal, which allowed Inter's Christian Eriksen to score directly from a corner; however, he later played a decisive role in Napoli's progression to the 2020 Coppa Italia Final, producing several important saves, and also starting the play which led to Dries Mertens's record–breaking equalising goal with a long kick, which allowed Napoli to earn a 1–1 home draw and a 2–1 aggregate victory. He was suspended for the final against Juventus on 17 June, however; Meret started in his place, with Napoli winning 4–2 on penalties following a goalless draw.

Al Nassr
On 11 July 2022, Ospina joined Saudi Arabian club Al Nassr on a free transfer.

International career

Ospina had his first international experience representing Colombia's under-20 team. Ospina was called up for the first time in the national U-20 team for 2005 FIFA World Youth Championship. At only 16 years old, Ospina was the youngest member of the squad, however he did not play any game during the whole tournament. Ospina was called back for the 2007 South American U-20 Championship, where he played four games. However, Colombia failed to qualify for the World Cup, the last youth tournament he had the opportunity to play in.

Ospina made his debut for the Colombia national team as a substitute in the 1–3 defeat against Uruguay. He played his first match in a 2010 FIFA World Cup qualification match against Bolivia, becoming the youngest goalkeeper to play for the Colombia national team.

Ospina was selected as the main goalkeeper for Colombia throughout the 2014 FIFA World Cup qualification competition. At the end of the qualifiers, Ospina conceded the fewest goals of the tournament.

At the 2014 World Cup, Ospina appeared in all of Colombia's matches and conceded four goals throughout the tournament.

In Colombia’s Copa America Centenario quarterfinal match against Peru, he saved Miguel Trauco’s penalty kick which helped Colombia advance to the semifinals.

In May 2018, he was named in Colombia’s preliminary 35 man squad for the 2018 World Cup in Russia. Despite saving a penalty against Jordan Henderson in the Round of 16 penalty shoot-out against England, Colombia were eliminated 3–4 on penalties.

On 6 September 2019, Ospina played his 100th international match against Brazil, becoming the first Colombian goalkeeper to reach this milestone.

On 23 June 2021, Ospina made his 111th cap for Colombia in a 2–1 loss to hosts Brazil in the first round of the Copa América, equalling Carlos Valderrama as his nation's most capped player of all time. On 3 July, Ospina saved two spot-kicks as Colombia defeated Uruguay 4–2 on penalties following a 0–0 draw in the Copa América quarter-finals; he also made his 112th international appearances during the match, becoming the most capped player in Colombia's history outright.

Style of play
An agile, athletic, and acrobatic shot-stopper, Ospina is also known for his reflexes and his technical ability with his feet, as well as his distribution and ability to produce accurate throws, which allows him to play the ball out from the back and start attacks. Considered by pundits to be a promising goalkeeper in his youth, his former Nice manager, Frédéric Antonetti, once described him as an "international-standard goalkeeper," also stating: "He has everything you need to be a top goalkeeper. He's good in the air and he's good on the ground. He has that little extra something to be a champion. Hugo Lloris was an international-standard goalkeeper; so is David." He is also known for his reserved character and calm demeanour on the pitch. Although he was criticised in the media during his earlier career for being prone to rash errors, while his ability to command his area and decision-making about when to come off his line also came into question, he was able to improve in these areas as his career progressed due to his work-rate, in particular in his speed when rushing off his line and getting to ground to smother the ball – which makes him effective in one on one situations –, or when dealing with crosses; as such, he has been described by journalists as a "sweeper keeper," due to his playing style and ability to rush out of goal. However, despite his all-round improvement as he entered his prime, his tendency to commit errors has persisted, which has been a source of scrutiny from pundits. Standing at 1.83 m (6 ft), Ospina is not particularly tall for a goalkeeper; as such, his lack of height has occasionally limited him in the air at times, despite his bravery. He has also been accused of being inconsistent and unreliable in the media, despite his excellent and consistent performances at international level. Consequently, critical reception of Ospina has been divided; while his former Arsenal manager Wenger labelled him as the "best goalkeeper in the Premier League" in 2015, and as "a world-class goalkeeper" in 2016, Michael Cummings of Bleacher Report instead stated in 2015 that "Ospina is not a top-class goalkeeper," despite performing well for Arsenal since earning the starting role over Szczęsny earlier that year. Former Arsenal goalkeeper Bob Wilson instead described him as a "solid keeper" in 2018.

Personal life
Ospina was brother-in-law to fellow Colombian international footballer James Rodríguez, who married David's sister Daniela in 2011. However, they announced their separation in July 2017. Ospina has been married to Colombian model Jesica Sterling since 2012, and has one daughter named Dulce María and a son named Maximiliano.

Career statistics

Club

International

Honours
Atlético Nacional
Categoría Primera A: 2005 Apertura, 2007 Apertura, 2007 Finalización

Arsenal
FA Cup: 2014–15, 2016–17
FA Community Shield: 2017

Napoli
Coppa Italia: 2019–20

Colombia U20
Central American and Caribbean Games: 2006

Colombia
 Copa América third place: 2016, 2021

Individual
 Saudi Professional League Goalkeeper of the Month: October 2022'''

See also

 List of men's footballers with 100 or more international caps

References

External links

1988 births
Living people
Footballers from Medellín
Colombian footballers
Association football goalkeepers
Atlético Nacional footballers
OGC Nice players
Arsenal F.C. players
S.S.C. Napoli players
Al Nassr FC players
Categoría Primera A players
Ligue 1 players
Premier League players
Serie A players
Saudi Professional League players
Colombia under-20 international footballers
Colombia international footballers
2014 FIFA World Cup players
2015 Copa América players
Copa América Centenario players
2018 FIFA World Cup players
2019 Copa América players
2021 Copa América players
FIFA Century Club
Colombian expatriate footballers
Colombian expatriate sportspeople in France
Colombian expatriate sportspeople in England
Colombian expatriate sportspeople in Italy
Colombian expatriate sportspeople in Saudi Arabia
Expatriate footballers in France
Expatriate footballers in England
Expatriate footballers in Italy
Expatriate footballers in Saudi Arabia
Central American and Caribbean Games gold medalists for Colombia
Central American and Caribbean Games medalists in football
Competitors at the 2006 Central American and Caribbean Games
FA Cup Final players
21st-century Colombian people